Flower City Chaplain Corps Inc. (FCCC) is a Rochester, New York based non-profit Public Charity chaplaincy corps engaged in 
pastoral counseling at crime scenes, hospitals and businesses to provide crisis counseling  during traumatic events.

History
Flower City Chaplain Corps has two founders and phases of the organization. Dr. Tommy Davis, a former correctional chaplain and a graduate of Apex School of Theology, Tennessee Temple University, and Piedmont International University (Ph.D.), served as its CEO until September 2017.
 Chaplain Alisa Peña DiMora, graduate of Christopher Newport University, business owner and fitness trainer took over as the Chief and Executive Director in 2017. She re-directed the organization's mission to "promote the safety and stability of the community by providing confidential, practical and spiritual care to first responders and their families and bridge the gap between police and the community they serve."  The ultimate objective is to serve and provide care for area first responders under the "officer Wellness" umbrella. The organization has grown to serve 4 police agencies in the Monroe County NY area and receives request to service non police agencies as well.

 FCCC chaplains attend a 10 week training academy and complete a 3 month Mental Health Coaching for First Responders certification before they can serve. 
  
The FCCC was incorporated in the State of New York February 24, 2012 and received its tax exemption from the IRS in July 2013 as a 
charitable organization. It is registered with the New York State Public Charities Bureau.  Their First Division central office is located at 244 Lake Road, in the town of Webster. New York.

References

External links

Non-profit organizations based in New York (state)
Organizations based in Rochester, New York